Cieśle  is a village in the administrative district of Gmina Oleśnica, within Oleśnica County, Lower Silesian Voivodeship, in south-western Poland. In 1871-1945 it was part of Germany.

Notable residents
 August Ludwig von Nostitz, Prussian general
 Renata von Scheliha, German classical philologist
 Rudolf von Scheliha (1897-1942), German diplomat executed by the German Nazis during World War II

References

Villages in Oleśnica County